Mascarenhas ( or ) is a habitational name taken from the civil parish of Mascarenhas in Mirandela, Portugal. This name is also found in Brazil, Spain, India (particularly in Goa, Mangalore and Tuticorin) and where it was taken by Portuguese colonists. Recently, this surname may be used by citizens of the United Kingdom and the United States.
It may refer to these persons:

 Dimitri Mascarenhas, Sri Lankan British cricketer
 Francisco de Mascarenhas, 13th vice-regent of Portuguese controlled India, 1581–1584
 D. Fernando Martins Mascarenhas, Bishop of Faro (16th century)
 Mascarenhas de Moraes, Brazilian field marshal and commander of Brazilian Expeditionary Force
 Mascarenhas, Portuguese footballer
 Neville Anthony Mascarenhas, Pakistani journalist and author
 Kate Mascarenhas, English novelist
 Pedro Mascarenhas, Portuguese explorer and colonial administrator
 António Mascarenhas Monteiro, Cape Verdean politician
 Rodrigo Mascarenhas, Cape Verdean basketball player
 Tuna Mascarenhas (1944–2009), Cape Verdean activist
 Zaneta Mascarenhas, Indo-Australian engineer and politician

Fictional characters
 Charlie Mascarenhas, a fictional character from the film Players

Joseph Mascarenhas, fictional guitarist from the film Rock On!!

See also
 Administrative divisions of Portugal

References

Portuguese-language surnames